Barrio Cuba is a 2005 Cuban drama film directed by Humberto Solás.

Cast 
 Jorge Perugorría
 Isabel Santos
 Mario Limonta
 Adela Legrá
 Luisa María Jiménez
 Rafael Lahera

References

External links 

2005 drama films
2005 films
Cuban drama films